Aghcheh Qeshlaq-e Sofla (also Romanized as Āghcheh Qeshlāq-e Soflá; also known as Āghcheh Qeshlāq-e Pā’īn, Āqcheh Qeshlāq-e Soflá, and Hūrānī) is a village in Sanjabad-e Shomali Rural District, in the Central District of Kowsar County, Ardabil Province, Iran. At the 2006 census, its population was 68, in 12 families.

References 

Towns and villages in Kowsar County